The North East derby is a football fixture which can relate to the following:

Tees–Wear derby between Middlesbrough F.C. and Sunderland A.F.C. in England
Tyne–Tees derby between Newcastle United and Middlesbrough F.C. in England
Tyne–Wear derby between Newcastle United and Sunderland A.F.C. in England
North derby between Aberdeen F.C. and Inverness Caledonian Thistle in Scotland